The epidemiology of cancer is the study of the factors affecting cancer, as a way to infer possible trends and causes.  The study of cancer epidemiology uses epidemiological methods to find the cause of cancer and to identify and develop improved treatments.

This area of study must contend with problems of lead time bias and length time bias. Lead time bias is the concept that early diagnosis may artificially inflate the survival statistics of a cancer, without really improving the natural history of the disease. Length bias is the concept that slower growing, more indolent tumors are more likely to be diagnosed by screening tests, but improvements in diagnosing more cases of indolent cancer may not translate into better patient outcomes after the implementation of screening programs. A related concern is overdiagnosis, the tendency of screening tests to diagnose diseases that may not actually impact the patient's longevity. This problem especially applies to prostate cancer and PSA screening.

Some cancer researchers have argued that negative cancer clinical trials lack sufficient statistical power to discover a benefit to treatment. This may be due to fewer patients enrolled in the study than originally planned.

Organizations 

State and regional cancer registries are organizations that abstract clinical data about cancer from patient medical records. These institutions provide information to state and national public health groups to help track trends in cancer diagnosis and treatment. One of the largest and most important cancer registries is Surveillance Epidemiology and End Results (SEER), administered by the US Federal government.

Health information privacy concerns have led to the restricted use of cancer registry data in the United States Department of Veterans Affairs and other institutions. The American Cancer Society predicts that approximately 1,690,000 new cancer cases will be diagnosed and 577,000 Americans will ultimately die of cancer in 2012.

Studies 

Observational epidemiological studies that show associations between risk factors and specific cancers mostly serve to generate hypotheses about potential interventions that could reduce cancer incidence or morbidity. Randomized controlled trials then test whether hypotheses generated by epidemiological studies and laboratory research actually result in reduced cancer incidence and mortality. In many cases, findings from observational epidemiological studies are not confirmed by randomized controlled trials.

Risk factors 

The most significant risk factor is age.  According to cancer researcher Robert A. Weinberg, "If we lived long enough, sooner or later we all would get cancer."  Essentially all of the increase in cancer rates between prehistoric times and people who died in England between 1901 and 1905 is due to increased lifespans.

Although the age-related increase in cancer risk is well-documented, the age-related patterns of cancer are complex. Some types of cancer, like testicular cancer, have early-life incidence peaks, for reasons unknown. Besides, the rate of age-related increase in cancer incidence varies between cancer types with, for instance, prostate cancer incidence accelerating much faster than brain cancer. It has been proposed that the age distribution of cancer incidence can be viewed as the distribution of probability to accumulate the required number of driver events by the given age.

Over a third of cancer deaths worldwide (and about 75-80% of cancers in the United States) are due to potentially modifiable risk factors. The leading modifiable risk factors worldwide are:
 tobacco smoking, which is strongly associated with lung cancer, mouth, and throat cancer;
 drinking alcohol, which is associated with a small increase in oral, esophageal, breast, liver and other cancers;
 a diet low in fruit and vegetables,
 physical inactivity, which is associated with increased risk of colon, breast, and possibly other cancers
 obesity, which is associated with colon, breast, endometrial, and possibly other cancers
 sexual transmission of human papillomavirus, which causes cervical cancer and some forms of anal cancer, vaginal cancer, vulvar cancer, penile cancer, rectal cancer, and oropharyngeal cancer.

Men with cancer are twice as likely as women to have a modifiable risk factor for their disease.

Other lifestyle and environmental factors known to affect cancer risk (either beneficially or detrimentally) include the use of exogenous hormones (e.g., hormone replacement therapy causes breast cancer), exposure to ionizing radiation and ultraviolet radiation, and certain occupational and chemical exposures. A Western diet is associated with increased exposure of the gastrointestinal tract to bile acids that are produced by the body to digest fatty foods.  Bile acids are likely endogenous etiologic agents in gastrointestinal cancer.

Every year, at least 200,000 people die worldwide from cancer related to their workplace. Millions of workers run the risk of developing cancers such as pleural and peritoneal mesothelioma  from inhaling asbestos fibers, or leukemia from exposure to benzene at their workplaces. Currently, most cancer deaths caused by occupational risk factors occur in the developed world. It is estimated that approximately 20,000 cancer deaths and 40,000 new cases of cancer each year in the U.S. are attributable to occupation.

Rates and mortality 

In the U.S. cancer is second only to cardiovascular disease as the leading cause of death; in the UK it is the leading cause of death. In many developing countries cancer incidence (insofar as this can be measured) appears much lower, most likely because of the higher death rates due to infectious disease or injury. With the increased control over malaria and tuberculosis in some Third World countries, incidence of cancer is expected to rise; in the Eastern Mediterranean region, for example, cancer incidence is expected to increase by 100% to 180% in the next 15 years due to increases in life expectancy, an increasing proportion of elderly people, and the successful control of childhood disease. This is termed the epidemiologic transition in epidemiological terminology.

Cancer epidemiology closely mirrors risk factor spread in various countries. Hepatocellular carcinoma (liver cancer) is rare in the West but is the main cancer in China and neighbouring countries, most likely due to the endemic presence of hepatitis B and aflatoxin in that population. Similarly, with tobacco smoking becoming more common in various Third World countries, lung cancer incidence has increased in a parallel fashion.

India 
According to the National Cancer Registry Programme of the India Council of Medical Research (ICMR), more than 1300 Indians die every day due to cancer. Between 2012 and 2014, the mortality rate due to cancer increased by approximately 6%. In 2012,  there were 478,180 deaths out of 2,934,314 cases reported. In 2013 there were 465,169 deaths out of  3,016,628 cases. In 2014, 491,598 people died in out of 2,820,179 cases.
According to the Population Cancer Registry of Indian Council of Medical Research, the incidence and mortality of cancer is highest in the north-eastern region of the country. Breast cancer is the most common, and stomach cancer is the leading cause of death by cancer for the population as a whole. Breast cancer and lung cancer kill the most women and men respectively.

Canada 

In Canada, as of 2007, cancer is the number one cause of death, contributing to 29.6% of all deaths in the country. The second highest cause of death is cardiovascular diseases resulting in 21.5% of deaths. As of 2011, prostate cancer was the most common form of cancer among males (about 28% of all new cases) and breast cancer the most common in females (also about 28% of all new cases).

The leading cause of death in both males and females is lung cancer, which contributes to 26.8% of all cancer deaths. Statistics indicate that between the ages of 20 and 50 years, the incidence rate of cancer is higher amongst women whereas after 50 years of age, the incidence rate increases in men. Predictions by the Canadian Cancer Society indicate that with time, there will be an increase in the rates of incidence of cancer for both males and females. Cancer will thus continue to be a persistent issue in years to come.

United States 

In the United States, cancer is responsible for 25% of all deaths with 30% of these from lung cancer. The most commonly occurring cancer in men is prostate cancer (about 25% of new cases) and in women is breast cancer (also about 25%). Cancer can occur in children and adolescents, but it is uncommon (about 150 cases per million in the U.S.), with leukemia the most common. In the first year of life the incidence is about 230 cases per million in the U.S., with the most common being neuroblastoma. Data from 2004 to 2008 in the United States indicates that the overall age-adjusted incidence of cancer was approximately 460 per 100,000 men and women per year.

Cancer is responsible for about 25% of all deaths in the U.S., and is a major public health problem in many parts of the world. The statistics below are estimates for the U.S. in 2008, and may vary substantially in other countries. They exclude basal and squamous cell skin cancers, and carcinoma in situ in locations other than the urinary bladder. As seen, breast/prostate cancer, lung cancer and colorectal cancer are responsible for approximately half of cancer incidence. The same applies for cancer mortality, but with lung cancer replacing breast/prostate cancer as the main cause.

In 2016, an estimated 1,685,210 new cases of cancer will be diagnosed in the United States and 595,690 people will die from the disease.

Incidence of a second cancer in survivors
In the developed world, one in three people will develop cancer during their lifetimes.  If all cancer patients survived and cancer occurred randomly, the normal lifetime odds of developing a second primary cancer (not the first cancer spreading to a new site) would be one in nine.  However, cancer survivors have an increased risk of developing a second primary cancer, and the odds are about two in nine.  About half of these second primaries can be attributed to the normal one-in-nine risk associated with random chance.

The increased risk is believed to be primarily due to the same risk factors that produced the first cancer, such as the person's genetic profile, alcohol and tobacco use, obesity, and environmental exposures, and partly due, in some cases, to the treatment for the first cancer, which might have included mutagenic chemotherapeutic drugs or radiation.  Cancer survivors may also be more likely to comply with recommended screening, and thus may be more likely than average to detect cancers.

Children 

Childhood cancer and cancer in adolescents is rare (about 150 cases per million yearly in the US). Leukemia (usually acute lymphoblastic leukemia) is the most common cancer in children aged 1–14 in the U.S., followed by the central nervous system cancers, neuroblastoma, Wilms' tumor, and non-Hodgkin's lymphoma. Statistics from the SEER program of the US NCI demonstrate that childhood cancers increased 19% between 1975 and 1990, mainly due to an increased incidence in acute leukemia. Since 1990, incidence rates have decreased.

Infants 

The age of peak incidence of cancer in children occurs during the first year of life, in infants.  The average annual incidence in the United States, 1975–1995, was 233 per million infants.  Several estimates of incidence exist.  According to SEER, in the United States:
Neuroblastoma comprised 28% of infant cancer cases and was the most common malignancy among these young children (65 per million infants).
The leukemias as a group (41 per million infants) represented the next most common type of cancer, comprising 17% of all cases.
Central nervous system malignancies comprised 13% of infant cancer, with an average annual incidence rate of nearly 30 per million infants.
The average annual incidence rates for malignant germ cell and malignant soft tissue tumors were essentially the same at 15 per million infants.  Each comprised about 6% of infant cancer.

Teratoma (a germ cell tumor) often is cited as the most common tumor in this age group, but most teratomas are surgically removed while still benign, hence not necessarily cancer. Prior to the widespread routine use of prenatal ultrasound examinations, the incidence of sacrococcygeal teratomas diagnosed at birth was 25 to 29 per million births.

Female and male infants have essentially the same overall cancer incidence rates, a notable difference compared to older children.

White infants have higher cancer rates than black infants.  Leukemias accounted for a substantial proportion of this difference: the average annual rate for white infants (48.7 per million) was 66% higher than for
black infants (29.4 per million).

Relative survival for infants is very good for neuroblastoma, Wilms' tumor and retinoblastoma, and fairly good (80%) for leukemia, but not for most other types of cancer.

See also
 List of countries by cancer rate
 Epidemiology of breast cancer

General:
Cancer cluster
Cancer research
Genetic epidemiology
Incidentaloma, a symptom-free tumor that is found accidentally and whose treatment may be unimportant

References

External links
CANCERMondial — International Agency for Research on Cancer (IARC)
Cancer Epidemiology Resources — CancerIndex
Surveillance, Epidemiology and End Results — National Cancer Institute
Cancer's global footprint — Pulitzer Center

Cancer
Carcinogenesis